Russell Thurlow Vought (born March 26, 1976) is an American former government official who was the director of the Office of Management and Budget from July 2020 to January 2021. He was previously deputy director of the OMB from 2018 to 2020 and acting director from 2019 to 2020.  

After Joe Biden was elected president, Biden and his transition team accused Vought of hindering the incoming administration's transition by refusing to allow incoming Biden officials to meet with OMB staff. Vought denied the accusations. 

In 2021, Vought founded the organization the Center for Renewing America, which is focused on combating critical race theory.

Education 
Vought earned his Bachelor of Arts from Wheaton College and his Juris Doctor from the George Washington University Law School.

Career 
Vought worked for Heritage Action, the lobbying arm of the Heritage Foundation. He was the executive director and budget director of the Republican Study Committee, the policy director for the Republican Conference of the United States House of Representatives, and a legislative assistant for U.S. Senator Phil Gramm.

Office of Management and Budget (OMB)

Deputy OMB Director 
In April 2017, President Trump nominated Vought to be deputy director of the Office of Management and Budget (OMB). He was confirmed by the Senate on February 28, 2018, in a 50–49 vote. Vice President Mike Pence cast the tie-breaking vote.

During the confirmation hearings for Vought's nomination to the OMB, Senator Bernie Sanders questioned Vought about a statement that "Muslims do not simply have a deficient theology. They do not know God because they have rejected Jesus Christ his Son, and they stand condemned." The Atlantic magazine and various Christian organizations denounced Sanders's questioning as a violation of the No Religious Test Clause.

In 2019, Vought was one of nine government officials who defied a subpoena to testify before Congress in relation to the Trump–Ukraine scandal and the administration's decision to freeze military aid to Ukraine. The decision to freeze aid to Ukraine had led Democrats to launch the first impeachment of Donald Trump.

OMB director 
On January 2, 2019, when OMB Director Mick Mulvaney became acting White House chief of staff, Vought became the acting OMB director, though Mulvaney continued to hold the director position. On March 18, 2020, Trump announced his intent to nominate him to be OMB Director. Vought was confirmed by the Senate on July 20, 2020, by a vote of 51–45; and was sworn in two days later.

In May 2020, Vought broke the OMB's long-standing practice of publishing updated economic forecasts, citing disruption caused by the coronavirus pandemic.

On September 4, 2020, Vought, at the direction of President Trump, published an OMB memo instructing federal agencies to identify all contracts or other agency spending related to any training on "critical race theory" or "white privilege" and to identify all available avenues within the law to cancel any such contracts and/or to divert federal dollars away from these training sessions.

2020 election 
After Joe Biden won the 2020 presidential election, Vought was accused by Biden and his transition team of hindering the Biden administration transition by refusing to allow incoming Biden officials to meet with OMB staff. Typically, career OMB staff would provide an incoming administration with cost estimates and details on existing programs. 

Vought defended his action stating that OMB had provided funding for the transition and that there had been more than 45 meetings with Biden officials but that "OMB staff are working on this Administration's policies and will do so until this Administration's final day in office." Some experts said that Vought's refusal to cooperate was unprecedented, while other OMB staffers said it was common practice.

Center for Renewing America
In January 2021, Vought started an organization called the Center for Renewing America and an affiliated issue advocacy group called American Restoration Action. According to Axios, the groups "will provide the ideological ammunition to sustain Trump's political movement after his departure from the White House."

In 2021, the Washington Post fact-checker rated Vought's statement that only 5 to 7 percent of the Biden administration's $2.3 trillion infrastructure plan would go to "actual roads and bridges and ports and things that you and I would say is real infrastructure" as "Three Pinocchios" out of four.

On June 8, 2021, Citizens for Renewing America (CRA), the advocacy arm of Center for American Restoration, released a guide to "combatting critical race theory." Vought told Fox News the 33-page handbook is "a crash course in CRT, a 'one-stop shopping' for parents trying to hold their school board members accountable." 

Vought confirmed that on June 22, 2022, federal agents conducted a search of the home of CRA's Director of Litigation, Jeffrey Clark, who is the former Justice Department official who participated in efforts to challenge the results of the 2020 presidential election.

Notes

References

External links
 Center for Renewing America

|-

1976 births
Living people
21st-century American lawyers
Deputy Directors for Management of the Office of Management and Budget
Directors of the Office of Management and Budget
George Washington University Law School alumni
The Heritage Foundation
Trump administration cabinet members
Wheaton College (Illinois) alumni